Louis Benecke (May 1, 1843 – August 29, 1919) was an American businessman, lawyer, and politician.

Biography
Benecke was born in Stiege, Duchy of Brunswick, Germany. In 1856, Benecke emigrated with his family to the United States and settled in Brunswick, Missouri. During the American Civil War, he served in the Union Army in the 18th Missouri Volunteer Infantry Regiment and the 49th Missouri Volunteer Infantry Regiment. Benecke was admitted to the Missouri bar and practiced law in Brunswick, Missouri. He was also involved in the banking, telephone, and manufacturing businesses. Benecke served on the Brunswick City Council and served as mayor of Brunswick. He also served on the Brunswick Board of Education and was the vice-president of the school board. Benecke was involved in the Republican Party in Chariton County, Missouri. Benecke served in the Missouri Senate from 1869 to 1875. He wrote: Historical Sketch The "Sixties" in Chariton County, Missouri.  In 1919. Benecke died in Brunswick, Missouri after a long illness. His brother was Robert Benecke, who was a photographer.

Notes

External links

1843 births
1919 deaths
German emigrants to the United States
People from the Duchy of Brunswick
People from Oberharz am Brocken
People from Brunswick, Missouri
People of Missouri in the American Civil War
Businesspeople from Missouri
Missouri lawyers
Writers from Missouri
School board members in Missouri
Missouri city council members
Mayors of places in Missouri
Republican Party Missouri state senators
19th-century American businesspeople
19th-century American lawyers